Hualongqiao station, formerly known as Huacun station during planning, is a station on Line 9 of Chongqing Rail Transit in Chongqing municipality, China, which opened in 2022. It is located in Yuzhong District, close to several skyscrapers at the south end of Jiahua Bridge. The station is the highest station in the world surpassing the height of Smith–Ninth Streets station in New York. The station is a 6 story tall structure with Line 10 trains stopping 48 meters above the surface. The station will have connections to the adjacent supertall Chongqing International Trade and Commerce Center.

References

Railway stations in Chongqing
Railway stations in China opened in 2022
Chongqing Rail Transit stations